Zaina Hazem Faisal Hassan (born 8 July 2004), also known as Zaina Hazem, is a Jordanian footballer who plays as a defender for the Jordan women's national team.

Her recent matches and career summary.

Her Seasons/Career Profile:

References 

2004 births
Living people
Jordan women's international footballers
Jordanian women's footballers
Women's association football midfielders
Sportspeople from Amman